Odisha State Highway 4 is a state highway of Odisha. It connects Gunupur to Koraput, and passes through Jaykaypur.

References

State highways in Odisha
Transport in Koraput